Ma is a Hungarian magazine connected with the Magyar Aktivizmus (Hungarian Activism) artistic group whose title not only reflects their initials but also means "today". It was founded in 1916 in Budapest by Lajos Kassák, who continued to publish it in exile in Vienna until 1925.

History

Origins
MA was launched after a previous journal A Tett ("The Action") had been banned by the prosecutor's office in October 1916. The first issue was published the following month. From 1917 Béla Uitz joined the editorial team followed by Sándor Bortnyik, Jolán Simon, Sándor Barta and Erzsi Újvári.

Under the Hungarian Soviet Republic
Following the Aster Revolution, the MA activists were critical of Mihály Károlyi's government. They agitated for a communist revolution publishing  special issues in support of revolutionary change. When the Hungarian Soviet Republic was established on 21 March 1919, at first it seemed that the MA group would play an important role in the new regime as Kassak and Uitz had positions in the directorates of literature and art. However, when they refused to subordinate their work to the control of the Party of Communists in Hungary, they were the attacked by the Hungarian Social Democrats, who accused György Lukács, the Deputy Commissar for Public Education, of wasting money on their "incomprehensible" and "formalist" avant-garde art. However, Bela Kun denounced the MA group as a product of "bourgeois decadence". Therefore, from a political point of view, the art of MA ended up in an interpretative vacuum. In July 1919, the regime faced a chronic shortage in paper, and the MA (as well as other periodicals) was discontinued. Kassák left for Lake Balaton when MA was suspended. In August, following the fall of the Hungarian Soviet Republic he was imprisoned only being released in the winter thanks to the intervention of his partner, Jolán Simon. He then escaped to Vienna.

In Vienna
Kassák refounded the magazine in Vienna on May 1, 1920. He continued to publish it there until December 1, 1925. 33 issues were produced during this period. It was based Kassak's rented room in Hietzing, although he did a lot of editorial work in nearby cafés. The magazine generally contained articles written in Hungarian, Kassák was aiming at an international readership. His first programmatic text in exile was addressed to "all artists of the world". This increases level of interaction globally led Kassák to evolve his theoretical views, abandoning Expressionism in favour of Dadaism and Constructivism. Kassák wrote to the Zürich Dada Movement, and received a number of periodicals from Tristan Tzara.

On 20 November 1920 MA sponsored a "Russian Evening" featuring a slide show and lecture by Konstantin Umansky.

In 1926 Kassák returned to Budapest and founded the journal Dokumentum which he saw as a successor to MA. However it was discontinued after only five issues

Contributors

Contributors include:

Writers
 Hans Arp
 Sándor Barta
 Blaise Cendrars
 Jean Cocteau
 Alexic Dragan
 Claire Goll
 Vicente Huidobro
 Richard Huelsenbeck
 Ernő Kállai (under the pseudonym Péter Mátyás)
 Fernand Léger
 Franz Liebhard
 Ljubomir Micić
 Gorham Munson
 Nikolai Punin
 Hans Richter 
 Andor Sugar

Artists
 Sándor Bortnyik
 Theo van Doesburg
 Petar Dobrović
 Albert Gleizes
 Lajos Gulácsy
 Raoul Hausmann
 Iván Hevesy
 Vilmos Huszár
 János Kmetty
 Jacques Lipchitz
 El Lissitzky
 János Mácza
Hans Mattis-Teutsch
 László Moholy-Nagy
 Piet Mondrian
 Jószef Nemes-Lampérth
 Jacobus John Pieter Oud
 Francis Picabia
 Man Ray
 Oskar Schlemmer
 Vladimir Tatlin
 Béla Uitz

References

Avant-garde magazines
Defunct magazines published in Hungary
Hungarian art
Hungarian-language magazines
Magazines established in 1916
Magazines disestablished in 1925
Magazines published in Budapest
Magazines published in Vienna